Lin Yueshan (born 19 October 1988) is a Chinese Paralympic archer.

In the 2016 Summer Paralympics, her debut games, Lin won her first medal which was silver.

References

Paralympic archers of China
Archers at the 2016 Summer Paralympics
Paralympic silver medalists for China
Living people
Chinese female archers
1988 births
Medalists at the 2016 Summer Paralympics
Paralympic medalists in archery
21st-century Chinese women
Medalists at the 2018 Asian Para Games